Elaine I. Tuomanen, M.D. is an American pediatrician and chair of the Department of Infectious Diseases at St. Jude Children's Research Hospital.  She is noted for her research on Molecular pathogenesis of Streptococcus pneumoniae.

Career
Elaine Tuomanen received her M.D. from McGill University. She is a member of the Association of American Physicians and a Fellow of the American Academy for Microbiology. 
At St. Jude’s Research Hospital, she focuses on the pathogenesis of infectious diseases in children, which can be seen in her initiatives of the Children’s GMP Manufacturing Facility and the Translational Trials Unit.
Among her influential contributions are studies that link pneumococcal virulence factors to specific host receptors, the inflammatory bioactivities of cell wall, and the increased susceptibility of children with sickle cell disease to pneumococcal disease. Her studies have been funded by the National Institutes of Health for over 30 years, and she has authored hundreds of peer-reviewed publications, reviews, and book chapters.

Recent publications
 Bacterial Peptidoglycan Transverses the Placenta to Induce Fetal Neuroproliferation and Aberrant Postnatal Behavior.
 Correlation Between the Interval of Influenza Virus Infectivity and Results of Diagnostic Assays in a Ferret Model.
 Streptococcus pneumoniae translocates into the myocardium and forms unique microlesions that disrupt cardiac function.

Awards

 1980 Bristol Award, The American Society for Infectious Diseases
 1987 Outstanding Young Woman of America
 1983-1986  Parker B. Francis Research Award, The American Thoracic Society
 1986 Vector Outstanding Young Investigator Research Award, American Society for Microbiology
 1997 E. Mead Johnson Award of American Academy of Pediatrics, Outstanding Research in Pediatrics
 1998 Maxwell Finland Award from Infectious Diseases Society of America 
 2006 Selected as one of "America’s Top Pediatricians"
 2010 Fellow of the American Academy of Microbiology
 2012 Member of the Association of American Physicians
 2014 The inaugural Pediatric Infectious Diseases Society (PIDS) Distinguished Research Award

References

1951 births
Living people
American women biologists
McGill University Faculty of Medicine alumni
21st-century American women